Deer Hunter II: The Hunt Continues is a 1998 video game from WizardWorks. An add-on for the game titled Deer Hunter II Extended Season was released in May 1999.

Development
Deer Hunter II was first teased in July 1998. The game was officially announced a month later in August. The title was endorsed by Wildlife Forever, a Minneapolis-based nonprofit organization dedicated to maintaining America's wildlife heritage. A portion of the sales from this game was donated to Wildlife Forever.

Reception

Computer Gaming World gave the game a score of 4 out of 5 stating"Deer Hunter II is a game that, while it won’t appeal to the non-hunting, hard-core gaming crowd, is just right for real-life hunters or anyone who wants a fun diversion between work assignments"

Sales
The game shipped more than 500,000 units by October 1998 and more than 800,000 by January 1999. According to PC Data Deer Hunter II was the best-selling game of November 1998, it was also the best-selling piece of PC software for that month, beating out the Windows 98 upgrade

References

1998 video games
Video game sequels
WizardWorks games
Windows games
Windows-only games